Tylenchida is an order of nematodes.

List of families 

 Superfamily Criconematoidea
 Family  Criconematidae   
 Family  Tylenchulidae
 Superfamily Tylenchoidea
 Family  Anguinidae     
 Family  Belonolaimidae
 Family  Dolichodoridae
 Family  Ecphyadophoridae 
 Family  Hoplolaimidae     
 Family  Heteroderidae     
 Family  Pratylenchidae    
 Family  Tylenchidae     
 Superfamily Sphaerularina
 Family  Allantonematidae  
 Family  Fergusobiidae     
 Family  Iotonchiidae     
 Family  Parasitylenchidae
 Family  Sphaerulariidae

References

Further reading 
 Mohammad Rafiq Siddiqui. Tylenchida: Parasites of Plants and Insects. 2nd ed. Wallingford: CABI Publishing, 2000.

External links 
 Order Tylenchida, Nematode Identification at the University of Florida Entomology and Nematology Department

 
Nematode orders